John P. Campo, Sr. (February 24, 1938 - November 14, 2005) was an American Thoroughbred racehorse trainer.

Campo was born in East Harlem, New York and raised in Ozone Park, Queens. He is best known as the trainer of 1981 Kentucky Derby and Preakness Stakes winner Pleasant Colony. Among his other notable horses, John Campo conditioned both of 1973's 2-year-old Eclipse Award winners, the Champion 2-Year-Old Filly Talking Picture, the exceptional Jim French, and Champion 2-Year-Old Colt, Protagonist.

In January 1986, Campo suffered a devastating loss when thirty-six of his thirty-eight horses died when a fire swept through his racetrack barn at Belmont Park.

After suffering a stroke, John Campo retired in 1996. During his thirty years training horses he saddled 1,431 winners from 12,826 starters. He was living in Hewlett, New York on Long Island when he died in 2005. He is buried at Pinelawn Memorial Park in Farmingdale, New York on Long Island. His son, Paul J. Campo, is the racing secretary for the New York Racing Association. John P. Campo Jr. followed in his father's footsteps and is also a trainer.

References

 2003 Churchill Downs story on trainer John Campo
 John P. Campo, Sr.'s obituary at Bloodhorse.com

1938 births
2005 deaths
American horse trainers
People from Hewlett, New York
People from Ozone Park, Queens
People from East Harlem